Vank or VANK may refer to:
VANK, the Voluntary Agency Network of Korea, a South Korean Internet-based organization
Nederlandsche Vereeniging voor Ambachts- en Nijverheidskunst (VANK)
Vank (վանք), the Armenian language word for monastery. By extension:
Vank, Armenia, a town
Vank, Martakert, a village in Nagorno-Karabakh
Vank Cathedral, an Armenian cathedral in Isfahan, Iran
 Banku (call to prayer), the Muslim call to public prayer on the Malabar Coast.

See also
Vang (disambiguation)
Vəng (disambiguation), several places in Azerbaijan
Wank (disambiguation)